Copestylum haagii, or Haag's bromeliad fly, is a species of syrphid fly in the family Syrphidae. They have been found in Western North America.

References

Eristalinae
Diptera of North America
Hoverflies of North America
Articles created by Qbugbot
Taxa named by Samuel Wendell Williston
Insects described in 1867